The Queen's Birthday Honours 1885 are the birthday honours announced in 1885 in celebration of the birthday of Queen Victoria.

The Most Honourable Order of the Bath
Appointments to the Order of the Bath were published in The London Gazette on 15 June 1885.

Knight Grand Cross of the Order of the Bath (GCB)
Civil Division
 Sir John Savile Lumley , Ambassador Extraordinary and Minister Plenipotentiary at Rome.

Knight Commander of the Order of the Bath (KCB)
Civil Division
 Nathaniel Barnaby , Director of Naval Construction.

Companion of the Order of the Bath (CB)
Civil Division
 The Right Honourable Marquess of Hamilton
 Hugh Owen, Permanent Secretary to the Local Government Board.
 Colonel Richard Hugh Stotherd, Royal Engineers, Director of the Survey Department.
 Lieutenant-Colonel Robert Owen Jones, Head of the Boundary Division of the Survey Department.
 Courtenay Boyle, Assistant Secretary to the Local Government Board.
 William Fraser , Deputy Keeper of Records, Scotland.
 Charles Benjamin Forsey, Joint Secretary to the Board of the Inland Revenue.
 Frederick Ebenezer Baines, Assistant Secretary of the General Post Office and Inspector General of Mails.

Order of St Michael and St George
Appointments to the Order of Saint Michael and Saint George were published in The London Gazette on 6 June 1885.

Knights Grand Cross of the Order of Saint Michael and Saint George (GCMG)
 The Right Honourable Lord Carrington, on appointment as Governor of the Colony of New South Wales.
 Major-General Sir Andrew Clarke, Inspector General of Fortifications and Director of Works.
 Sir Anthony Musgrave , Governor of the Colony of Queensland.
 Sir Frederick Aloysius Weld , Governor General of the Straight Settlements.

Knight Commander of the Order of Saint Michael and Saint George (KCMG)
 Adams George Archibald , late Lieutenant-Governor of the Province of Nova Scotia, in the Dominion of Canada.
 Charles Mills , Agent-General in London for the Cape of Good Hope.
 Major-General Peter Henry Scratchley , Her Majesty's Special Commissioner for the Protected Territory in New Guinea.
 Alexander Stuart, Premier and Colonial Secretary of New South Wales.

Companion of the Order of Saint Michael and Saint George (CMG)
 James Francis Garrick, Agent-General in London for Queensland.
 Edward Noel Walker, Colonial Secretary of the Island of Jamaica.
 Lorenzo, Marquis Cassar Dessain, lately a Member of the Council Government of Malta.
 Edward Fairfield, of the Colonial Office.
 Frederick Thomas Sargood, Minister of Defence of the Colony of Victoria.
 Major-General Major Francis Downes , Commandant of the Volunteer Forces of the Colony of South Australia.
 Colonel Charles Fyshe Roberts, late Major in the Royal Artillery, in command of the Artillery forces of the Colony of New South Wales.
 Lieutenant-Colonel Edward Robert Drury, late Acting-Commandant of the Volunteer Forces of the Colony of Queensland.

Order of the Star of India
Appointments to the Order of the Star of India were published in The London Gazette on 6 June 1885.

Knight Commander of the Star of India (KCSI)
 Colonel Edward Ridley Colborne Bradford , Madras Staff Corps, Agent to the Governor-General.

Companion of the Order of the Star of India (CSI)
 Herbert John Reynolds, Bengal Civil Service.
 James Macnabb Cuningham , Surgeon-General, Indian Medical Department.
 The Nawab Surfuraz Khan of Dera.
 Colonel Michael Weekes Willoughby, Bombay Staff Corps.
 Major Frederick Mercer Hunter, Bombay Staff Corps.

Order of the Indian Empire
Appointments to the Order of the Indian Empire were published in The London Gazette on 6 June 1885.

Companion of the Order of the Indian Empire (CIE)
 Major Robert Parry Nisbet, Bengal Staff Corps.
 Francis Day, Deputy Surgeon-General (Retired), Medical Department, Madras.
 James Baboneau Nickterlien Hennessey, late Deputy Superintendent, Indian Survey Department.
 Duluptram Dayabhoy.
 Captain Adalbert Cecil Talbot, Bengal Staff Corps, Political Agent, Bikanir State.
 James Burgess, Archaeological Surveyor and Reporter to Government, Bombay.
 George Hamnett, Inspector-General, Registration Department, Madras.
 Ramaswami Mudaliar.

Knight Bachelor
Appointments of Knight Bachelor were published in Times, London on 6 June 1885.
 Henry Christopher Mance, inventor of the heliograph.
 Peter Eade, late Mayor of Norwich.
 George Clement Bertram, Bailiff of the Island of Jersey.
 Captain Edward Walter, Commanding Officer of the Corps of Commissionaires.
 Mr Willis, Accountant-General to the Navy.

References

Birthday Honours
1885 awards
1885 in the United Kingdom